Warrap may refer to:

 Warrap, South Sudan, a town
 Warrap (state), a state of South Sudan